Joseph Silver (1868–1918) also known as the "King of Pimps", was a man who terrorized women in Johannesburg, South Africa during the late 19th century and early 20th century.

Name
His original Polish name "Lis" means "Fox". His alias "Silver", was a reference to his mother, whose maiden name was Kweksylber, which means Quicksilver. He was also known as Joe Liss, Joe Eligmann, James Smith, Joseph Schmidt, Jose Silva, Charlie Silver, Charles Greenbaum, Abraham Ramer and Ludwig.

Early life
He was born in 1868 in Kielce, Poland into a Jewish family, as one of nine children of tailor and petty criminal Ansel Lis. At the time of Joseph's birth, Kielce was located in Russian Poland.

Career
According to the book giving an account of his crimes, The Fox and the Flies, Silver began his criminal career in London in the 1880s. He served a sentence for burglary at Sing Sing prison in New York before appearing in South Africa in 1898. In Johannesburg he operated a network of cafes, cigar shops and police-protected brothels. During his time in South Africa Silver frequently engaged in litigation and wrote vehement letters to newspapers. The majority of his aliases appear to date from his period in South Africa.

From Johannesburg he is alleged to have gone to South America and thence to Europe, where his mugshot was taken by Paris police in 1909. During World War I Silver turned up in Austria-Hungary. He was executed in Austrian Galicia for espionage in 1918.

Jack the Ripper suspect
In 2007, South African historian Charles van Onselen claimed in the book The Fox and The Flies: The World of Joseph Silver, Racketeer and Psychopath that Silver was the infamous Jack the Ripper serial killer in London in 1888. Critics note, among other things, that van Onselen provides no evidence that Silver was even in London during the time of the murders and that the accusation is based entirely upon speculation. Van Onselen has responded that the number of circumstances involved should make Silver a suspect. He would have been 20 at the time, much younger than contemporary suspect descriptions of Jack the Ripper.

See also
List of Jack the Ripper suspects

References

External links
 "Historian claims to ID Jack the Ripper" Associated Press article

1868 births
1918 deaths
People from Kielce
People from Kielce Governorate
Jews from the Russian Empire
19th-century Polish criminals
20th-century Polish criminals
Jack the Ripper
South African pimps
Executed people from Świętokrzyskie Voivodeship
Polish expatriates in South Africa
People executed by Austria-Hungary